Blood Ties is a 1964 Soviet drama film directed by Mikhail Yershov.

Plot 
The film tells about Sergeant Vladimir Fedotov and a ferryman named Sonya, who met during the war and fell in love with each other.

Cast 
 Yevgeny Matveev as Sergeant Vladimir Feddotov
 Vija Artmane as Sonya, a ferryman 
 Tanya Doronina as Sonya in  childhood
 Anatoliy Papanov as Sonya's ex-husband
 Roza Sverdlova as doctor
  Yuri Fisenko  as Erik   
 Igor Selyuzhenok as Gondzik
 Vladimir Ratomsky as Drovosekin

References

External links 
 

1964 films
1960s Russian-language films
Soviet drama films
1964 drama films
Lenfilm films
Soviet romantic drama films
Soviet black-and-white films
Films based on Russian novels

Soviet World War II films